Fronimo is a software program for engraving of tablature for lutes, archlute, theorbo and other plucked and bowed instruments.

History
The program was created by the Italian lutenist and astronomer Francesco Tribioli.  He named it in honour of Il Fronimo by Vincenzo Galilei, one of the foremost music treatises of the 16th century.  One of Galilei's sons, Galileo, was also (amongst other talents) an astronomer, the same as Tribioli.

Version 2 of the program ceased to be updated from February 2005.  Version 3 was much improved though it introduced a new native file archive type, .ft3.

Description
The program contains historical fonts for the most common tablatures for the lute and guitar.

A fully functional demo version is available, and is restricted only so far as it is unable to save tablature files.  To enable files to be saved a licence must be purchased from the author.  Options are available for German, French, Italian and Spanish language interfaces.

There is a large repository of native tablature for the lute held in Fronimo .ft3 format files which can also be utilised by other  musical tablature software.

Reception
Specialist lute-tabulature software packages such as Fronimo are sometimes preferred by lutenists if they specialise in 17th century tablature, which can be more difficult to set up in packages such as Sibelius.  The licence cost of Fronimo may be thought to be reasonable compared to Sibelius when the functionality of that package is not required.

See also
Django (music software)

Notes and references

Notes

References

External links

Lutes